The Malta cricket team toured Bulgaria in September 2020 to play four Twenty20 International (T20I) matches. The matches were played on 23 and 24 September at the National Sports Academy "Vasil Levski" in Sofia, and were the first official T20I matches played in Bulgaria since the ICC announced that all matches between its member nations would be eligible for this status. Following the T20I series, the two sides played an additional four friendly T20 matches in the town of Gabrovo, 200 km west of Sofia, with the Bulgarians using those matches to give chances to players who would be eligible to play official matches for the national team from 2021. Malta won the T20I series 2–0 after both matches on the second day were abandoned due to rain.

Squads

T20I series

1st T20I

2nd T20I

3rd T20I

4th T20I

References

External links
 Series home at ESPN Cricinfo

Associate international cricket competitions in 2020–21